Madalena is a feminine given name. It is a Portuguese form of Magdalene. It may refer to:

People 
Madalena Alberto, Portuguese actress, singer and composer
Madalena Boavida, East Timorese politician
Maddalena Casulana, (c. 1544–c. 1590), Italian composer, lutenist and singer
Madalena Iglésias, (1939–2018), Portuguese actress and singer
Madalena dos Santos Reinbolt, (1919–1977), Brazilian painter and textile artist

Places 
Madalena, Brazil, in the State of Ceará, Brazil
Madalena (Lisbon), a civil parish in Lisbon, Portugal
Madalena (Tomar), a civil parish in Tomar, Portugal
Madalena, Vila Nova de Gaia, a civil parish in Vila Nova de Gaia, Portugal
Madalena (Azores), a municipality along the western coast of Pico, Portuguese Azores
Madalena (Madalena), a civil parish along the western coast of Pico, Portuguese Azores
Madalena do Mar, a civil parish in Machico, Portuguese Madeira
Madliena, part of Swieqi, Malta

Other uses 
 Madalena (film), a 1960 Greek film

See also
 Magdalene (given name)
 Magdalena (given name)
 Madeline (name)
 Madeleine (name)

Feminine given names